No Trifling with Love is a 1977 French drama film directed by Caroline Huppert. It is based on the theatrical work of Alfred de Musset of the same name.

Plot
The piece takes place in the castle of the Baron. His 21-year-old son, Perdican, recently received his Ph.D and returns to the castle, just when Camille, a beautiful 18-year-old girl and dear childhood friend, returns from the convent. The two young people meet after ten years of separation in this castle so dear to their hearts, where they grew up, played, and where they are loved. The Baron plans to marry the two cousins.

Perdican and Camille have always loved each other, but Camille was indoctrinated by the nuns. Most of the nuns went to the convent because they had lost their man to death, or because they were victims of unhappy love affairs, and taught Camille never to trust men, only to trust God. Because of all this she decides to return to the convent and leave Perdican.

Camille hides her feelings for Perdican. So she sends a letter to Louise, a nun of the convent who was strongly influenced by the example of her own misfortunes to dissuade her from leaving the place where it is "safe", in which she explains that she did everything to be hated by Perdican, and she says that he is in despair because of her marriage refusal.

During a quarrel between Dame Pluche and Blazius, Perdican accidentally finds that letter. Touched in his vanity, he lets his pride and vanity dominate, and decides to abuse the seductive Rosetta, a young peasant girl and Camille's foster sister, hoping to make Camille jealous.

But Camille learns from Dame Pluche that Perdican had read the letter, and so understands his plans. In revenge, she tells Rosette that Perdican mocks her. Rosette realizes the mistake and loses consciousness. Camille and Perdican finally confess their love in the last scene, but Rosette, watching them secretly, does not support this disillusionment and died of emotion: "She is dead. Farewell, Perdican." Concludes Camille.

Cast
 Isabelle Huppert - Camille
 Didier Haudepin - Perdican
 Sabine Haudepin - Rosette
 Jean Benguigui - Bridaine
 André Julien - Le baron
 Evelyne Bouix - La choriste
 Yves Elliot - Blazius
 Monique Couturier - Dame Pluche
 Christian Pernot - Le choriste

See also
 Isabelle Huppert on screen and stage

External links

1977 films
French drama films
1970s French-language films
1977 drama films
Films based on works by Alfred de Musset
Films directed by Caroline Huppert
1970s French films